Yurio Akitomi (born 13 September 1950) is a Japanese professional golfer.

Akitomi played on the Japan Golf Tour, winning three times.

Professional wins (4)

Japan Golf Tour wins (3)

Asia Golf Circuit wins (1)
1977 Thailand Open

External links

Japanese male golfers
Japan Golf Tour golfers
Sportspeople from Saga Prefecture
1950 births
Living people